Prodoxus californicus is a moth of the family Prodoxidae. It is found along the coast of southern California, United States.

The wingspan is 7.2-10.9 mm for males and 13.1-13.6 mm for females. The forewings are white with a dark brown pattern. The hindwings are white to very light gray. Adults are on wing in April.

The larvae feed on Yucca schidigera.

Etymology
The species name refers to the known range, which is a coastal portion of the California cismontane floristic province.

References

Moths described in 2005
Prodoxidae